South of Scotland was one of the eight electoral regions of the Scottish Parliament when it was created in 1999. The region was replaced with South Scotland in 2011 following a review.

Nine of the parliament's 73 first past the post constituencies were sub-divisions of the region and it elected seven of the 56 additional-member Members of the Scottish Parliament (MSPs). Thus it elected a total of 16 MSPs.

The region had boundaries with the West of Scotland, Central Scotland and Lothians regions.

Constituencies and council areas

The constituencies were created in 1999 with the names and boundaries of Westminster constituencies, as existing in at that time. They cover all of three council areas, the Scottish Borders council area, the Dumfries and Galloway council area and the South Ayrshire council area, and parts of five others, the East Ayrshire council area, the East Lothian council area, the Midlothian council area, the North Ayrshire council area and the South Lanarkshire council area:

The rest of the East Ayrshire council area is within the Central Scotland electoral region, the rest of the East Lothian and Midlothian council areas are within the Lothians region, the rest of the North Ayrshire council area is within the West of Scotland region and the rest of the South Lanarkshire council area is divided between the Central Scotland and Glasgow regions.

Members of the Scottish Parliament

Constituency MSPs

Regional List MSPs
N.B. This table is for presentation purposes only

Election results

2007 Scottish Parliament election
In the 2007 Scottish Parliament election the region elected MSPs as follows: 	

 5 Labour MSPs (all constituency members)
 5 Scottish National Party MSPs (all additional members) 	 	
 4 Conservative MSPs (three constituency members and one additional member)
 2 Liberal Democrat MSPs (one constituency member and one additional member)

Constituency results
{| class=wikitable
!colspan=4 style=background-color:#f2f2f2|2007 Scottish Parliament election: South of Scotland
|-
! colspan=2 style="width: 200px"|Constituency
! style="width: 150px"|Elected member
! style="width: 300px"|Result

Additional member results
{| class=wikitable
!colspan=8 style=background-color:#f2f2f2|2007 Scottish Parliament election: South of Scotland
|-
! colspan="2" style="width: 150px"|Party
! Elected candidates
! style="width: 40px"|Seats
! style="width: 40px"|+/−
! style="width: 50px"|Votes
! style="width: 40px"|%
! style="width: 40px"|+/−%
|-

2003 Scottish Parliament election
In the 2003 Scottish Parliament election the region elected MSPs as follows:

 5 Labour MSPs (all constituency members)
 4 Conservative MSP (two constituency members and two additional members)
 3 Scottish National Party MSPs (all additional members)
 2 Liberal Democrat MSPs (both constituency members)
 1 Scottish Greens MSP (additional member)
 1 Scottish Socialist Party MSP (additional member)

Constituency results
{| class=wikitable
!colspan=4 style=background-color:#f2f2f2|2003 Scottish Parliament election: South of Scotland
|-
! colspan=2 style="width: 200px"|Constituency
! style="width: 150px"|Elected member
! style="width: 300px"|Result

Additional member results
{| class=wikitable
!colspan=8 style=background-color:#f2f2f2|2003 Scottish Parliament election: South of Scotland
|-
! colspan="2" style="width: 150px"|Party
! Elected candidates
! style="width: 40px"|Seats
! style="width: 40px"|+/−
! style="width: 50px"|Votes
! style="width: 40px"|%
! style="width: 40px"|+/−%
|-

 
 

Changes
 Derek Brownlee replaced David Mundell. Mundell resigned as an MSP in June 2005 following his election to Westminster in the 2005 general election. Brownlee was next on the Conservative list.
Rosemary Byrne resigned from the Scottish Socialist Party in September 2006 and then sat as a member of Solidarity.

1999 Scottish Parliament election
In the 1999 Scottish Parliament election the region elected MSPs as follows:

 6 Labour MSPs (all constituency members)
 4 Scottish National Party MSPs (one constituency member and three additional members)
 4 Conservative MSPs (all additional members)
 2 Liberal Democrat MSPs (both constituency members)

Constituency results
{| class=wikitable
!colspan=4 style=background-color:#f2f2f2|1999 Scottish Parliament election: South of Scotland
|-
! colspan=2 style="width: 200px"|Constituency
! style="width: 150px"|Elected member
! style="width: 300px"|Result
 

 
Changes:
 On 21 December 1999 Ian Welsh resigned, citing family reasons. He was the first MSP to resign, and as of 2005 remains the shortest serving MSP serving 230 days. At the subsequent Ayr by-election in 2000, John Scott won the seat for the Conservatives.

Additional member results
{| class=wikitable
!colspan=8 style=background-color:#f2f2f2|1999 Scottish Parliament election: South of Scotland
|-
! colspan="2" style="width: 150px"|Party
! Elected candidates
! style="width: 40px"|Seats
! style="width: 40px"|+/−
! style="width: 50px"|Votes
! style="width: 40px"|%
! style="width: 40px"|+/−%
|-

Notes and references 

Scottish Parliament constituencies and regions 1999–2011